The Muse is the fifth studio album by The Wood Brothers, released on October 1, 2013.

Track listing

References

2013 albums
The Wood Brothers albums